John Cramer was an American lawyer and politician who served two terms as a United States representative from New York from 1833 to 1837.

Early life and education 
He was born in Waterford on May 17, 1779.  

He attended the rural schools and was graduated from Union College in 1801.  He studied law, was admitted to the bar and commenced practice in Waterford.  He was a presidential elector on the ticket of Thomas Jefferson and George Clinton in 1804.

Career 
Cramer was appointed a master in chancery in 1805, and served as a member of the New York State Assembly in 1806 and 1811.  

He served in the New York State Senate, and was a delegate to the State constitutional convention in 1821.

Congress 
He was elected as a Jacksonian to the Twenty-third and Twenty-fourth Congresses (March 4, 1833 – March 3, 1837).

Later career 
He served again as a member of the State assembly in 1842.

Death 
Cramer died in Waterford on June 1, 1870.  His interment was in Waterford Rural Cemetery.

References

1779 births
1870 deaths
Union College (New York) alumni
Jacksonian members of the United States House of Representatives from New York (state)
19th-century American politicians

Members of the United States House of Representatives from New York (state)